Rukometni Klub Lokomotiva Zagreb is a Croatian professional women's handball club from Zagreb. They are currently competing in the 2022–23 Women's EHF Champions League.

Lokomotiva was the most successful team in the Yugoslav Championship's early stages, winning eight championships between 1956 and 1970. In 1975, the team reached the final of the European Cup after winning its ninth championship. However, the following fifteen years were unsuccessful, with Radnički Belgrade dominating the championship. The team resurfaced in 1991, winning both the final edition of the Yugoslav Championship and the EHF Cup, its first international trophy, beating Bayer Leverkusen in the final.

Following the breakup of Yugoslavia, Lokomotiva, renamed Kraš Zagreb, won the first edition of the new Croatian League, but the team soon fell second to Podravka Koprivnica. The team's major successes in the 1990s were reaching the Cup Winner's Cup's final in 1996 and 1998. The club reversed to its original name in 2003, and the following seasons marked a timid revival, with Lokomotiva winning the three championship titles and four national cups.

Most recently, Lokomotiva was second in the national championship and won the EHF Challenge Cup in 2017.

Lokomotiva gave eight players of the national team which are surprisingly won the bronze medal at the 2020 European Women's Handball Championship (Lucija Bešen, Dora Kalaus, Larissa Kalaus, Paula Posavec, Stela Posavec, Tena Japundža, Kristina Prkačin and Andrea Šimara). Also the Lokomotiva's coach Nenad Šoštarić was the head coach of the that generation.

Honours
 EHF Cup
 1991
 EHF Challenge Cup
 2017
 Croatian League
 1992, 2004, 2014, 2022
 Croatian Cup
 1992, 2005, 2007, 2014, 2018, 2021
 Yugoslav Championship (defunct)
 1956, 1959, 1962, 1964, 1965, 1968, 1969, 1970, 1974, 1991
 Yugoslav Cup  (defunct)
 1956, 1957, 1958, 1959, 1960, 1965, 1971, 1988

European record

Team

Current squad 

Squad for the 2022–23 season

Goalkeepers
 1  Lena Ivancok
 12  Ema Novosel
Wingers
LW
 2  Tina Wurth
 10  Ivona Skalić
 33  Margarita Škarić
RW
 3  Lara Burić
 17  Tena Japundža
 22  Kala Kosovac
Line players
 18  Marija Kaluđerović
 19  Ines Lisjak
 34  Lara Fureš
 77  Sanja Dabevska

Back players
LB
 9  Terezija Ćurić
 14  Tena Petika
 31  Andrea Sedloska
CB
 4  Mia Tupek
 5  Ana Malec
 8  Stela Posavec
 44  Iva Zrilić
RB
 7  Klara Birtić
 25  Maja Bilandžić

Transfers 
Transfers for the 2023–24 season

 Joining
  Petra Marinovic (GK) (from  Brest Bretagne Handball)
  Ema Alivodić (LP) (from  CSM București)

 Leaving
  Sanja Dabevska (LP) (to ?)
  Tena Petika (LB) (to  OGC Nice Côte d'Azur Handball) 
  Lena Ivancok (GK) (to  Neckarsulmer SU)

References

External links
Official website 

Lokomotiva
Lokomotiva handball
Women's sports teams in Croatia
Women's handball clubs
Railway sports teams
Women's handball in Croatia